In geology, a graben is a depressed block of the crust of a planet or moon, bordered by parallel normal faults.

Etymology
Graben is a loan word from German, meaning 'ditch' or 'trench'. The word was first used in the geologic context by Eduard Suess in 1883. The plural form is either graben or grabens.

Formation
A graben is a valley with a distinct escarpment on each side caused by the displacement of a block of land downward. Graben often occur side by side with horsts. Horst and graben structures indicate tensional forces and crustal stretching.

Graben are produced from parallel normal faults, where the displacement of the hanging wall is downward, while that of the footwall is upward. The faults typically dip toward the center of the graben from both sides. Horsts are parallel blocks that remain between graben; the bounding faults of a horst typically dip away from the center line of the horst. Single or multiple graben can produce a rift valley.

Half-graben

In many rifts, the graben are asymmetric, with a major fault along only one of the boundaries, and these are known as half-graben. The polarity (throw direction) of the main bounding faults typically alternates along the length of the rift. The asymmetry of a half-graben strongly affects syntectonic deposition. Comparatively little sediment enters the half-graben across the main bounding fault because of footwall uplift on the drainage systems. The exception is at any major offset in the bounding fault, where a relay ramp may provide an important sediment input point. Most of the sediment will enter the half-graben down the unfaulted hanging wall side (e.g., Lake Baikal).

Examples

Africa
 East African Rift Valley
 Lucapa Graben, Lunda Norte Province, Angola

Antarctica
 Lambert Graben, Antarctica

Asia
 Narmada River Valley, central India
 lower Godavari River Valley, southern India
 Baikal Rift Zone, Siberia, Russia
 Moma Graben, Sakha Republic, Russia
 Büyük Menderes Graben, Turkey
 Fossa Magna, Honshu, Japan
 Ariake Sea as part of the Unzen graben, Kyushu, Japan 
 Beppu–Shimabara graben, Kyushu, Japan

Europe
 Rhine valley, border area of west Germany and northeast France 
 Oslo graben around Oslo, Norway
 Central Lowlands, Scotland
 Worcester Basin, England
 Central Graben, North Sea
 Viking Graben, North Sea
 Vättern, Sweden
 Lowtherville Graben, Ventnor, Isle of Wight, England

North America

Canada
 Ottawa-Bonnechere Graben, Ontario and Quebec, Canada
 Saguenay Graben, Quebec, Canada

Guatemala
 Guatemala City valley, Guatemala

United States
 Basin and Range Province of southwestern North America is an example of multiple horst/graben structures, including Death Valley, with Salt Lake Valley being the easternmost and Owens Valley being the westernmost.
 Lake George Basin, New York, U.S.
 Lake Tahoe Basin, California and Nevada, U.S.
 Republic Graben, Republic, Washington, U.S.
 Rio Grande Rift Valley in Colorado/New Mexico/Texas of the United States
 Rough Creek Graben, Kentucky, U.S.
 Santa Clara Valley, California, U.S.
 Western Snake River Plain, Idaho, U.S.
 Southwest San Bernardino Valley (Arizona), U.S.

Multi-national
 Eastern North America Rift Basins, Canada and the U.S.
 Midcontinent Rift System, Canada and the U.S.
 Salton Trough, Mexico and the U.S.

Oceania
 Firth of Thames of Hauraki Gulf and Hauraki Plains of Hauraki Rift (Hauraki half grabens), North Island, New Zealand
 Tikitere Graben within the Taupō Rift, North Island, New Zealand.
 Gulf St Vincent, South Australia, Australia
 Tamar Valley, Tasmania, Australia

South America
 Guanabara Graben, Rio de Janeiro, Brazil

See also
European Cenozoic Rift System

Notes

References

 

Structural geology
 
Tectonic landforms